Asteridiella solani is a species of fungus in the family Meliolaceae, first described by Daniel McAlpine in 1897, who gave the following description:

References

Meliolaceae
Taxa described in 1897
Taxa named by Daniel McAlpine